In mathematics a Cauchy–Euler operator is a differential operator of the form  for a polynomial p.  It is named after Augustin-Louis Cauchy and Leonhard Euler.  The simplest example is that in which p(x) = x, which has eigenvalues n = 0, 1, 2, 3, ... and corresponding eigenfunctions xn.

See also 
 Cauchy–Euler equation
 Sturm–Liouville theory

References 

Differential operators